The 2021 WST Pro Series was a professional ranking snooker tournament, taking place from 18 January to 21 March 2021 at the Marshall Arena in Milton Keynes, England. The event featured 128 players, and was played over three stages of round-robin groups of eight players, with the Final Group winner as the tournament champion.

Seven-time World Champion, Stephen Hendry, was due to make his return to the professional snooker tour, having initially retired in 2012. However, he withdrew before the tournament began.

Gary Wilson made his third career maximum break in the second frame of his Group G match with Liam Highfield.

Mark Williams won the only edition of the event, winning the 23rd ranking title of his career on his 46th birthday, becoming the third oldest ranking event winner behind Welsh compatriots Doug Mountjoy who was 46 in 1989 and Ray Reardon who was 50 in 1982.

Tournament format
There were 128 players taking part in the event. In the tournament's first stage players were divided into 16 groups of each eight players, with the top two players of each group advancing to the second group stage. The tournament draw was conducted on 8 January 2021.

The second group stage consisted of four groups, also of each eight players, with the top two players of each group advancing to the final group.

The winner of the final group were crowned as tournament champion.

All matches were played as best of three frames, and players were ranked, using the following criteria:
 Matches won (Points scored)	
 Frame difference
 Head-to-head match(es)
 Highest break

Prize fund 
The breakdown of prize money for the tournament is shown below.

First group stage
Winner: £4,000
Runner-up: £3,000
3rd Place: £2,500
4th Place: £2,000
5th Place: £1,500
6th Place: £1,000
7th Place: £500
8th Place: £0

Second group stage
Winner: £10,000
Runner-up: £7,500
3rd place: £5,000
4th place: £4,000
5th place: £3,000
6th place: £2,000
7th place: £1,500
8th place: £1,000

Final group stage
Winner: £20,000
Runner-up: £10,000
3rd place: £7,500
4th place: £5,000
5th place: £4,000
6th place: £3,000
7th place: £2,000
8th place: £1,000

Tournament total: £420,500

First group stage
The first group stage consisted of 16 groups, each containing eight players, with the top two of each group advancing to the second group stage.

Group A
Group A was played on 23 January 2021. Shaun Murphy and Louis Heathcote qualified for the Second Group stage.

Matches 

 Shaun Murphy 2–0 Brian Ochoiski
 Michael Holt 2–0 Fraser Patrick
 Alan McManus 2–0 Ken Doherty
 Louis Heathcote 2–1 Xu Si
 Shaun Murphy 2–1 Fraser Patrick
 Michael Holt 1–2 Ken Doherty
 Alan McManus 2–0 Xu Si
 Louis Heathcote 2–1 Brian Ochoiski
 Shaun Murphy 2–1 Ken Doherty
 Michael Holt 0–2 Xu Si
 Alan McManus 0–2 Louis Heathcote
 Fraser Patrick 0–2 Brian Ochoiski
 Shaun Murphy 2–1 Xu Si
 Michael Holt 2–1 Louis Heathcote
 Alan McManus 2–0 Brian Ochoiski
 Ken Doherty 2–0 Fraser Patrick
 Shaun Murphy 2–1 Louis Heathcote
 Michael Holt 1–2 Alan McManus
 Xu Si 2–1 Fraser Patrick
 Ken Doherty 1–2 Brian Ochoiski
 Shaun Murphy 2–1 Alan McManus
 Michael Holt 2–1 Brian Ochoiski
 Louis Heathcote 2–1 Fraser Patrick
 Xu Si 2–0 Ken Doherty
 Shaun Murphy 2–0 Michael Holt
 Alan McManus 2–1 Fraser Patrick
 Louis Heathcote 2–0 Ken Doherty
 Xu Si 2–0 Brian Ochoiski

Table

Group B
Group B was played on 19 January 2021. Kyren Wilson and Sunny Akani qualified for stage two.

Matches 

 Kyren Wilson 2–1 Fan Zhengyi
 Li Hang 2–1 Dean Young
 Yuan Sijun 2–1 Kacper Filipiak
 Sunny Akani 2–1 Pang Junxu
 Kyren Wilson 2–0 Dean Young
 Li Hang 1–2 Kacper Filipiak
 Yuan Sijun 1–2 Pang Junxu
 Sunny Akani 2–0 Fan Zhengyi
 Kyren Wilson 2–0 Kacper Filipiak
 Li Hang 1–2 Pang Junxu
 Yuan Sijun 0–2 Sunny Akani
 Dean Young 0–2 Fan Zhengyi
 Kyren Wilson 2–0 Pang Junxu
 Li Hang 0–2 Sunny Akani
 Yuan Sijun 2–0 Fan Zhengyi
 Kacper Filipiak 2–1 Dean Young
 Kyren Wilson 2–0 Sunny Akani
 Li Hang 2–0 Yuan Sijun
 Pang Junxu 2–0 Dean Young
 Kacper Filipiak 1–2 Fan Zhengyi
 Kyren Wilson 1–2 Yuan Sijun
 Li Hang 2–1 Fan Zhengyi
 Sunny Akani 2–0 Dean Young
 Pang Junxu 2–0 Kacper Filipiak
 Kyren Wilson 1–2 Li Hang
 Yuan Sijun 2–0 Dean Young
 Sunny Akani 0–2 Kacper Filipiak
 Pang Junxu 2–0 Fan Zhengyi

Table 

Aaron Hill was initially due to take part in Group B, but he withdrew and was replaced by Dean Young.

Group C
Group C was played on 21 January 2021. Stuart Bingham and Sam Craigie qualified for the Second Group stage.

Matches 

 Stuart Bingham 2–0 Jamie Curtis-Barrett
 Scott Donaldson 2–1 Billy Castle
 Sam Craigie 2–0 Ashley Carty
 Chris Wakelin 1–2 Jamie Clarke
 Stuart Bingham 2–0 Billy Castle
 Scott Donaldson 0–2 Ashley Carty
 Sam Craigie 2–0 Jamie Clarke
 Chris Wakelin 2–1 Jamie Curtis-Barrett
 Stuart Bingham 2–0 Ashley Carty
 Scott Donaldson 1–2 Jamie Clarke
 Sam Craigie 2–1 Chris Wakelin
 Billy Castle 2–1 Jamie Curtis-Barrett
 Stuart Bingham 2–0 Jamie Clarke
 Scott Donaldson 0–2 Chris Wakelin
 Sam Craigie 2–0 Jamie Curtis-Barrett
 Ashley Carty 0–2 Billy Castle
 Stuart Bingham 2–0 Chris Wakelin
 Scott Donaldson 2–0 Sam Craigie
 Jamie Clarke 2–0 Billy Castle
 Ashley Carty 2–1 Jamie Curtis-Barrett
 Stuart Bingham 2–0 Sam Craigie
 Scott Donaldson 2–0 Jamie Curtis-Barrett
 Chris Wakelin 2–1 Billy Castle
 Jamie Clarke 1–2 Ashley Carty
 Stuart Bingham 2–0 Scott Donaldson
 Sam Craigie 2–0 Billy Castle
 Chris Wakelin 2–1 Ashley Carty
 Jamie Clarke 2–0 Jamie Curtis-Barrett

Table

Group D
Group D was played on 12 March 2021. Barry Hawkins and Ricky Walden qualified for the Second Group stage.

Matches 

 Barry Hawkins 2–0 Paul Davison
 Ricky Walden 2–1 Farakh Ajaib
 Jimmy Robertson 2–0 Duane Jones
 Alexander Ursenbacher 2–1 Gerard Greene
 Barry Hawkins 2–0 Farakh Ajaib
 Ricky Walden 2–1 Duane Jones
 Jimmy Robertson 0–2 Gerard Greene
 Alexander Ursenbacher 2–0 Paul Davison
 Barry Hawkins 2–0 Duane Jones
 Ricky Walden 2–0 Gerard Greene
 Jimmy Robertson 2–0 Alexander Ursenbacher
 Farakh Ajaib 2–1 Paul Davison
 Barry Hawkins 2–1 Gerard Greene
 Ricky Walden 2–1 Alexander Ursenbacher
 Jimmy Robertson 1–2 Paul Davison
 Duane Jones 1–2 Farakh Ajaib
 Barry Hawkins 2–1 Alexander Ursenbacher
 Ricky Walden 2–1 Jimmy Robertson
 Gerard Greene 2–1 Farakh Ajaib
 Duane Jones 2–0 Paul Davison
 Barry Hawkins 0–2 Jimmy Robertson
 Ricky Walden 2–0 Paul Davison
 Alexander Ursenbacher 2–0 Farakh Ajaib
 Gerard Greene 2–1 Duane Jones
 Barry Hawkins 2–1 Ricky Walden
 Jimmy Robertson 2–0 Farakh Ajaib
 Alexander Ursenbacher 0–2 Duane Jones
 Gerard Greene 1–2 Paul Davison

Table

Group E
Group E was played on 14 March 2021. Mark Selby and Stuart Carrington qualified for the Second Group stage.

Matches 

 Mark Selby 2–0 Daniel Womersley
 Matthew Selt 1–2 Lukas Kleckers
 Joe O'Connor 0–2 Soheil Vahedi
 Stuart Carrington 2–0 Eden Sharav
 Mark Selby 2–1 Lukas Kleckers
 Matthew Selt 1–2 Soheil Vahedi
 Joe O'Connor 0–2 Eden Sharav
 Stuart Carrington 2–0 Daniel Womersley
 Mark Selby 0–2 Soheil Vahedi
 Matthew Selt 2–0 Eden Sharav
 Joe O'Connor 0–2 Stuart Carrington
 Lukas Kleckers 2–0 Daniel Womersley
 Mark Selby 2–0 Eden Sharav
 Matthew Selt 2–1 Stuart Carrington
 Joe O'Connor 2–0 Daniel Womersley
 Soheil Vahedi 2–1 Lukas Kleckers
 Mark Selby 2–0 Stuart Carrington
 Matthew Selt 2–0 Joe O'Connor
 Eden Sharav 2–0 Lukas Kleckers
 Soheil Vahedi 1–2 Daniel Womersley
 Mark Selby 2–0 Joe O'Connor
 Matthew Selt 2–0 Daniel Womersley
 Stuart Carrington 2–1 Lukas Kleckers
 Eden Sharav 1–2 Soheil Vahedi
 Mark Selby 2–1 Matthew Selt
 Joe O'Connor 2–0 Lukas Kleckers
 Stuart Carrington 2–0 Soheil Vahedi
 Eden Sharav 1–2 Daniel Womersley

Table

Group F
Group F was played on 11 March 2021. Ben Woollaston and Fergal O'Brien qualified for the Second Group stage.

Matches 

 Robbie McGuigan 0–2 Fergal O'Brien
 Ben Woollaston 2–0 Riley Parsons
 Noppon Saengkham 2–0 Jordan Brown
 David Grace 0–2 Igor Figueiredo
 Robbie McGuigan 0–2 Riley Parsons
 Ben Woollaston 2–0 Jordan Brown
 Noppon Saengkham 2–0 Igor Figueiredo
 David Grace 2–1 Fergal O'Brien
 Robbie McGuigan 0–2 Jordan Brown
 Ben Woollaston 1–2 Igor Figueiredo
 Noppon Saengkham 2–1 David Grace
 Riley Parsons 2–1 Fergal O'Brien
 Robbie McGuigan 0–2 Igor Figueiredo
 Ben Woollaston 2–0 David Grace
 Noppon Saengkham 1–2 Fergal O'Brien
 Jordan Brown 2–0 Riley Parsons
 Robbie McGuigan 2–0 David Grace
 Ben Woollaston 2–0 Noppon Saengkham
 Igor Figueiredo 1–2 Riley Parsons
 Jordan Brown 1–2 Fergal O'Brien
 Robbie McGuigan 1–2 Noppon Saengkham
 Ben Woollaston 1–2 Fergal O'Brien
 David Grace 2–1 Riley Parsons
 Igor Figueiredo 2–1 Jordan Brown
 Robbie McGuigan 1–2 Ben Woollaston
 Noppon Saengkham 1–2 Riley Parsons
 David Grace 0–2 Jordan Brown
 Igor Figueiredo 0–2 Fergal O'Brien

Table 

Mark Allen was initially due to take part in Group F, but he withdrew and was replaced by Robbie McGuigan.

Group G
Group G was played on 20 January 2021. Lu Ning and Martin O'Donnell
qualified for the Second Group stage.

Matches 

 Gary Wilson 0–2 John Astley
 Lu Ning 2–1 Rory McLeod
 Martin O'Donnell 2–1 Zhao Jianbo
 Liam Highfield 0–2 Jamie O'Neill
 Gary Wilson 1–2 Rory McLeod
 Lu Ning 0–2 Zhao Jianbo
 Martin O'Donnell 2–0 Jamie O'Neill
 Liam Highfield 2–0 John Astley
 Gary Wilson 2–1 Zhao Jianbo
 Lu Ning 2–1 Jamie O'Neill
 Martin O'Donnell 2–0 Liam Highfield
 Rory McLeod 1–2 John Astley
 Gary Wilson 2–1 Jamie O'Neill
 Lu Ning 2–0 Liam Highfield
 Martin O'Donnell 2–0 John Astley
 Zhao Jianbo 2–1 Rory McLeod
 Gary Wilson 1–2 Liam Highfield
 Lu Ning 2–0 Martin O'Donnell
 Jamie O'Neill 2–1 Rory McLeod
 Zhao Jianbo 0–2 John Astley
 Gary Wilson 2–1 Martin O'Donnell
 Lu Ning 2–0 John Astley
 Liam Highfield 2–0 Rory McLeod
 Jamie O'Neill 2–0 Zhao Jianbo
 Gary Wilson 2–1 Lu Ning
 Martin O'Donnell 2–0 Rory McLeod
 Liam Highfield 2–1 Zhao Jianbo
 Jamie O'Neill 2–0 John Astley

Table 

Stephen Hendry was initially due to take part in Group G, but he withdrew and was replaced by John Astley.

Group H
Group H was played on 10 March 2021. Ali Carter and Mark Davis qualified for the second Group stage.

Matches 

 Hamim Hussain 0–2 Kuldesh Johal
 Ali Carter 2–0 Dylan Emery
 Mark Davis 2–0 Simon Lichtenberg
 Tian Pengfei 1–2 Chang Bingyu
 Hamim Hussain 1–2 Dylan Emery
 Ali Carter 2–0 Simon Lichtenberg
 Mark Davis 2–0 Chang Bingyu
 Tian Pengfei 2–1 Kuldesh Johal
 Hamim Hussain 0–2 Simon Lichtenberg
 Ali Carter 2–0 Chang Bingyu
 Mark Davis 0–2 Tian Pengfei
 Dylan Emery 2–1 Kuldesh Johal
 Hamim Hussain 1–2 Chang Bingyu
 Ali Carter 2–0 Tian Pengfei
 Mark Davis 0–2 Kuldesh Johal
 Simon Lichtenberg 2–1 Dylan Emery
 Hamim Hussain 0–2 Tian Pengfei
 Ali Carter 0–2 Mark Davis
 Chang Bingyu 2–1 Dylan Emery
 Simon Lichtenberg 2–0 Kuldesh Johal
 Hamim Hussain 0–2 Mark Davis
 Ali Carter 2–0 Kuldesh Johal
 Tian Pengfei 1–2 Dylan Emery
 Chang Bingyu 1–2 Simon Lichtenberg
 Hamim Hussain 1–2 Ali Carter
 Mark Davis 2–0 Dylan Emery
 Tian Pengfei 0–2 Simon Lichtenberg
 Chang Bingyu 2–0 Kuldesh Johal

Table 

Yan Bingtao and Amine Amiri were initially due to take part in Group H, but they withdrew and were replaced by Hamim Hussain and Dylan Emery respectively.

Group I
Group I was played on 15 March 2021. Ben Hancorn and Lyu Haotian qualified for the Second Group stage.

Matches 

 Ronnie O'Sullivan 2–0 Jamie Wilson
 Tom Ford 2–1 Ben Hancorn
 Lyu Haotian 2–1 David Lilley
 Mark Joyce 2–0 Chen Zifan
 Ronnie O'Sullivan 1–2 Ben Hancorn
 Tom Ford 1–2 David Lilley
 Lyu Haotian 2–0 Chen Zifan
 Mark Joyce 0–2 Jamie Wilson
 Ronnie O'Sullivan 0–2 David Lilley
 Tom Ford 1–2 Chen Zifan
 Lyu Haotian 2–0 Mark Joyce
 Ben Hancorn 2–1 Jamie Wilson
 Ronnie O'Sullivan 1–2 Chen Zifan
 Tom Ford 0–2 Mark Joyce
 Lyu Haotian 2–0 Jamie Wilson
 David Lilley 0–2 Ben Hancorn
 Ronnie O'Sullivan 2–1 Mark Joyce
 Tom Ford 1–2 Lyu Haotian
 Chen Zifan 1–2 Ben Hancorn
 David Lilley 2–0 Jamie Wilson
 Ronnie O'Sullivan 0–2 Lyu Haotian
 Tom Ford 2–1 Jamie Wilson
 Mark Joyce 0–2 Ben Hancorn
 Chen Zifan 2–1 David Lilley
 Ronnie O'Sullivan 0–2 Tom Ford
 Lyu Haotian 0–2 Ben Hancorn
 Mark Joyce 2–1 David Lilley
 Chen Zifan 0–2 Jamie Wilson

 Note: Ronnie O'Sullivan was docked a frame for arriving late to his match with Mark Joyce, so trailing 0–1 before the match even started. O'Sullivan won the next two frames in 14 minutes to win 2–1.

Table

Group J
Group J was played on 9 March 2021. Oliver Lines and James Cahill qualified for the Second Group stage.

Matches 

 David Gilbert 2–1 Iulian Boiko
 Martin Gould 1–2 Oliver Lines
 Elliot Slessor 2–1 Peter Lines
 Ian Burns 1–2 James Cahill
 David Gilbert 1–2 Oliver Lines
 Martin Gould 1–2 Peter Lines
 Elliot Slessor 1–2 James Cahill
 Ian Burns 0–2 Iulian Boiko
 David Gilbert 2–0 Peter Lines
 Martin Gould 0–2 James Cahill
 Elliot Slessor 2–1 Ian Burns
 Oliver Lines 2–0 Iulian Boiko
 David Gilbert 1–2 James Cahill
 Martin Gould 0–2 Ian Burns
 Elliot Slessor 2–1 Iulian Boiko
 Peter Lines 0–2 Oliver Lines
 David Gilbert 0–2 Ian Burns
 Martin Gould 0–2 Elliot Slessor
 James Cahill 0–2 Oliver Lines
 Peter Lines 2–0 Iulian Boiko
 David Gilbert 2–0 Elliot Slessor
 Martin Gould 2–0 Iulian Boiko
 Ian Burns 2–0 Oliver Lines
 James Cahill 2–1 Peter Lines
 David Gilbert 2–1 Martin Gould
 Elliot Slessor 0–2 Oliver Lines
 Ian Burns 2–1 Peter Lines
 James Cahill 2–1 Iulian Boiko

Table

Group K
Group K was played on 22 January 2021. Zhao Xintong and Dominic Dale qualified for the Second Group stage.

Matches 

 Anthony McGill 2–1 Lee Walker
 Zhao Xintong 1–2 Peter Devlin
 Mark King 0–2 Si Jiahui
 Dominic Dale 2–1 Andy Hicks
 Anthony McGill 0–2 Peter Devlin
 Zhao Xintong 2–0 Si Jiahui
 Mark King 0–2 Andy Hicks
 Dominic Dale 2–0 Lee Walker
 Anthony McGill 0–2 Si Jiahui
 Zhao Xintong 1–2 Andy Hicks
 Mark King 2–1 Dominic Dale
 Peter Devlin 1–2 Lee Walker
 Anthony McGill 2–0 Andy Hicks
 Zhao Xintong 2–0 Dominic Dale
 Mark King 2–0 Lee Walker
 Si Jiahui 2–0 Peter Devlin
 Anthony McGill 2–1 Dominic Dale
 Zhao Xintong 2–0 Mark King
 Andy Hicks 2–0 Peter Devlin
 Si Jiahui 0–2 Lee Walker
 Anthony McGill 1–2 Mark King
 Zhao Xintong 2–1 Lee Walker
 Dominic Dale 2–0 Peter Devlin
 Andy Hicks 2–1 Si Jiahui
 Anthony McGill 0–2 Zhao Xintong
 Mark King 0–2 Peter Devlin
 Dominic Dale 2–1 Si Jiahui
 Andy Hicks 1–2 Lee Walker

Table

Group L
Group L was played on 24 January 2021. Luo Honghao and Zhou Yuelong qualified for the Second Group stage.

Matches 

 Thepchaiya Un-Nooh 2–0 Leo Fernandez
 Zhou Yuelong 2–0 Ashley Hugill
 Anthony Hamilton 2–1 Lei be Peifan
 Luo Honghao 2–1 Mitchell Mann
 Thepchaiya Un-Nooh 2–0 Ashley Hugill
 Zhou Yuelong 2–0 Lei Peifan
 Anthofny Hamilton 2–1 Mitchell Mann
 Luo Honghao 2–1 Leo Fernandez
 Thepchaiya Un-Nooh 0–2 Lei Peifan
 Zhou Yuelong 0–2 Mitchell Mann
 Anthony Hamilton 0–2 Luo Honghao
 Ashley Hugill 1–2 Leo Fernandez
 Thepchaiya Un-Nooh 1–2 Mitchell Mann
 Zhou Yuelong 0–2 Luo Honghao
 Anthony Hamilton 0–2 Leo Fernandez
 Lei Peifan 2–1 Ashley Hugill
 Thepchaiya Un-Nooh 1–2 Luo Honghao
 Zhou Yuelong 2–1 Anthony Hamilton
 Mitchell Mann 0–2 Ashley Hugill
 Lei Peifan 2–1 Leo Fernandez
 Thepchaiya Un-Nooh 0–2 Anthony Hamilton
 Zhou Yuelong 2–0 Leo Fernandez
 Luo Honghao 0–2 Ashley Hugill
 Mitchell Mann 2–0 Lei Peifan
 Thepchaiya Un-Nooh 0–2 Zhou Yuelong
 Anthony Hamilton 0–2 Ashley Hugill
 Luo Honghao 2–0 Lei Peifan
 Mitchell Mann 1–2 Leo Fernandez

Table

Group M
Group M was played on 18 January 2021. Joe Perry and Xiao Guodong qualified for the Second Group stage.

Matches 

 Joe Perry 2–0 Haydon Pinhey
 Xiao Guodong 2–0 Allan Taylor
 Matthew Stevens 2–0 Rod Lawler
 Daniel Wells 2–1 Jak Jones
 Joe Perry 2–0 Allan Taylor
 Xiao Guodong 2–0 Rod Lawler
 Matthew Stevens 2–0 Jak Jones
 Daniel Wells 2–0 Haydon Pinhey
 Joe Perry 1–2 Rod Lawler
 Xiao Guodong 2–0 Jak Jones
 Matthew Stevens 2–0 Daniel Wells
 Allan Taylor 2–0 Haydon Pinhey
 Joe Perry 2–1 Jak Jones
 Xiao Guodong 1–2 Daniel Wells
 Matthew Stevens 2–0 Haydon Pinhey
 Rod Lawler 0–2 Allan Taylor
 Joe Perry 2–1 Daniel Wells
 Xiao Guodong 2–0 Matthew Stevens
 Jak Jones 2–0 Allan Taylor
 Rod Lawler 2–0 Haydon Pinhey
 Joe Perry 2–1 Matthew Stevens
 Xiao Guodong 2–0 Haydon Pinhey
 Daniel Wells 2–0 Allan Taylor
 Jak Jones 2–1 Rod Lawler
 Joe Perry 2–1 Xiao Guodong
 Matthew Stevens 1–2 Allan Taylor
 Daniel Wells 0–2 Rod Lawler
 Jak Jones 2–0 Haydon Pinhey

Table

Group N
Group N was played on 25 January 2021. Jack Lisowski and Luca Brecel qualified for the Second Group stage.

Matches 

 Jack Lisowski 2–1 Michael White
 Graeme Dott 0–2 Zak Surety
 Luca Brecel 1–2 Brandon Sargeant
 Andrew Higginson 1–2 Jackson Page
 Jack Lisowski 0–2 Zak Surety
 Graeme Dott 0–2 Brandon Sargeant
 Luca Brecel 2–1 Jackson Page
 Andrew Higginson 2–1 Michael White
 Jack Lisowski 2–1 Brandon Sargeant
 Graeme Dott 0–2 Jackson Page
 Luca Brecel 1–2 Andrew Higginson
 Zak Surety 2–1 Michael White
 Jack Lisowski 2–1 Jackson Page
 Graeme Dott 0–2 Andrew Higginson
 Luca Brecel 2–1 Michael White
 Brandon Sargeant 1–2 Zak Surety
 Jack Lisowski 2–0 Andrew Higginson
 Graeme Dott 1–2 Luca Brecel
 Jackson Page 2–1 Zak Surety
 Brandon Sargeant 0–2 Michael White
 Jack Lisowski 1–2 Luca Brecel
 Graeme Dott 0–2 Michael White
 Andrew Higginson 2–1 Zak Surety
 Jackson Page 2–1 Brandon Sargeant
 Jack Lisowski 2–0 Graeme Dott
 Luca Brecel 2–0 Zak Surety
 Andrew Higginson 2–0 Brandon Sargeant
 Jackson Page 1–2 Michael White

Table

Group O
Group O was played on 16 March 2021. Judd Trump and Ryan Day qualified for the Second Group stage.

Matches 

 Judd Trump 2–0 Sean Maddocks
 Hossein Vafaei 1–2 Steven Hallworth
 Ryan Day 1–2 Jimmy White
 Jamie Jones 2–0 Barry Pinches
 Judd Trump 2–1 Steven Hallworth
 Hossein Vafaei 1–2 Jimmy White
 Ryan Day 2–0 Barry Pinches
 Jamie Jones 2–1 Sean Maddocks
 Judd Trump 2–1 Jimmy White
 Hossein Vafaei 1–2 Barry Pinches
 Ryan Day 2–0 Jamie Jones
 Steven Hallworth 2–1 Sean Maddocks
 Judd Trump 2–0 Barry Pinches
 Hossein Vafaei 1–2 Jamie Jones
 Ryan Day 2–0 Sean Maddocks
 Jimmy White 1–2 Steven Hallworth
 Judd Trump 2–0 Jamie Jones
 Hossein Vafaei 0–2 Ryan Day
 Barry Pinches 0–2 Steven Hallworth
 Jimmy White 2–1 Sean Maddocks
 Judd Trump 2–0 Ryan Day
 Hossein Vafaei 2–0 Sean Maddocks
 Jamie Jones 2–0 Steven Hallworth
 Barry Pinches 1–2 Jimmy White
 Judd Trump 0–2 Hossein Vafaei
 Ryan Day 2–0 Steven Hallworth
 Jamie Jones 2–1 Jimmy White
 Barry Pinches 2–0 Sean Maddocks

Table

Group P
Group P was played on 13 March 2021. Mark Williams and Robert Milkins qualified for the Second Group stage.

Matches 

 Mark Williams 2–0 Oliver Brown
 Alex Clenshaw 0–2 Florian Nüßle
 Robert Milkins 2–1 Gao Yang
 Nigel Bond 2–1 Robbie Williams
 Mark Williams 2–0 Florian Nüßle
 Alex Clenshaw 1–2 Gao Yang
 Robert Milkins 2–0 Robbie Williams
 Nigel Bond 1–2 Oliver Brown
 Mark Williams 2–0 Gao Yang
 Alex Clenshaw 1–2 Robbie Williams
 Robert Milkins 0–2 Nigel Bond
 Florian Nüßle 0–2 Oliver Brown
 Mark Williams 2–0 Robbie Williams
 Alex Clenshaw 2–0 Nigel Bond
 Robert Milkins 2–0 Oliver Brown
 Gao Yang 2–1 Florian Nüßle
 Mark Williams 2–0 Nigel Bond
 Alex Clenshaw 0–2 Robert Milkins
 Robbie Williams 2–1 Florian Nüßle
 Gao Yang 0–2 Oliver Brown
 Mark Williams 0–2 Robert Milkins
 Alex Clenshaw 1–2 Oliver Brown
 Nigel Bond 2–0 Florian Nüßle
 Robbie Williams 2–0 Gao Yang
 Mark Williams 2–0 Alex Clenshaw
 Robert Milkins 2–0 Florian Nüßle
 Nigel Bond 2–0 Gao Yang
 Robbie Williams 2–0 Oliver Brown

Table 

Kurt Maflin and Alex Borg were initially due to take part in Group P, but they withdrew and were replaced by Alex Clenshaw and Florian Nüßle respectively.

Second group stage
The second group stage consisted of four groups, each containing eight players, with the top two of each group advancing to the final group.

Group 1
Group 1 was played on 17 March 2021. Ali Carter and Mark Williams qualified for the Final Group Stage.

Matches 

 Ben Hancorn 1–2 Sunny Akani
 Martin O'Donnell 2–0 James Cahill
 Mark Williams 2–1 Lyu Haotian
 Ali Carter 2–0 Louis Heathcote
 Ben Hancorn 2–0 James Cahill
 Martin O'Donnell 2–0 Lyu Haotian
 Mark Williams 2–1 Louis Heathcote
 Ali Carter 2–1 Sunny Akani
 Ben Hancorn 0–2 Lyu Haotian
 Martin O'Donnell 2–1 Louis Heathcote
 Mark Williams 2–0 Ali Carter
 James Cahill 2–1 Sunny Akani
 Ben Hancorn 1–2 Louis Heathcote
 Martin O'Donnell 0–2 Ali Carter
 Mark Williams 1–2 Sunny Akani
 Lyu Haotian 0–2 James Cahill
 Ben Hancorn 0–2 Ali Carter
 Martin O'Donnell 2–1 Mark Williams
 Louis Heathcote 2–1 James Cahill
 Lyu Haotian 1–2 Sunny Akani
 Ben Hancorn 0–2 Mark Williams
 Martin O'Donnell 1–2 Sunny Akani
 Ali Carter 2–0 James Cahill
 Louis Heathcote 1–2 Lyu Haotian
 Ben Hancorn 0–2 Martin O'Donnell
 Mark Williams 2–0 James Cahill
 Ali Carter 2–1 Lyu Haotian
 Louis Heathcote 0–2 Sunny Akani

Table

Group 2
Group 2 was played on 18 March 2021. Kyren Wilson and Xiao Guodong qualified for the Final Group Stage.

Matches 

 Zhao Xintong 2–1 Lu Ning
 Shaun Murphy 2–1 Stuart Carrington
 Kyren Wilson 2–0 Robert Milkins
 Ben Woollaston 1–2 Xiao Guodong
 Zhao Xintong 0–2 Stuart Carrington
 Shaun Murphy 1–2 Robert Milkins
 Kyren Wilson 2–1 Xiao Guodong
 Ben Woollaston 2–1 Lu Ning
 Zhao Xintong 1–2 Robert Milkins
 Shaun Murphy 0–2 Xiao Guodong
 Kyren Wilson 1–2 Ben Woollaston
 Stuart Carrington 2–0 Lu Ning
 Zhao Xintong 0–2 Xiao Guodong
 Shaun Murphy 0–2 Ben Woollaston
 Kyren Wilson 2–0 Lu Ning
 Robert Milkins 2–1 Stuart Carrington
 Zhao Xintong 1–2 Ben Woollaston
 Shaun Murphy 0–2 Kyren Wilson
 Xiao Guodong 1–2 Stuart Carrington
 Robert Milkins 1–2 Lu Ning
 Zhao Xintong 2–1 Kyren Wilson
 Shaun Murphy 2–0 Lu Ning
 Ben Woollaston 1–2 Stuart Carrington
 Xiao Guodong 2–1 Robert Milkins
 Zhao Xintong 1–2 Shaun Murphy
 Kyren Wilson 2–1 Stuart Carrington
 Ben Woollaston 2–1 Robert Milkins
 Xiao Guodong 2–0 Lu Ning

Table

Group 3
Group 3 was played on 19 March 2021. Sam Craigie and Jack Lisowski qualified for the final Group stage.

Matches 

 Barry Hawkins 2–0 Luca Brecel
 Joe Perry 1–2 Mark Davis
 Luo Honghao 1–2 Sam Craigie
 Jack Lisowski 2–1 Fergal O'Brien
 Barry Hawkins 2–1 Mark Davis
 Joe Perry 0–2 Sam Craigie
 Luo Honghao 2–1 Fergal O'Brien
 Jack Lisowski 2–1 Luca Brecel
 Barry Hawkins 2–1 Sam Craigie
 Joe Perry 2–0 Fergal O'Brien
 Luo Honghao 1–2 Jack Lisowski
 Mark Davis 0–2 Luca Brecel
 Barry Hawkins 2–1 Fergal O'Brien
 Joe Perry 0–2 Jack Lisowski
 Luo Honghao 0–2 Luca Brecel
 Sam Craigie 0–2 Mark Davis
 Barry Hawkins 1–2 Jack Lisowski
 Joe Perry 2–1 Luo Honghao
 Fergal O'Brien 2–0 Mark Davis
 Sam Craigie 2–0 Luca Brecel
 Barry Hawkins 0–2 Luo Honghao
 Joe Perry 1–2 Luca Brecel
 Jack Lisowski 1–2 Mark Davis
 Fergal O'Brien 0–2 Sam Craigie
 Barry Hawkins 2–1 Joe Perry
 Luo Honghao 0–2 Mark Davis
 Jack Lisowski 0–2 Sam Craigie
 Fergal O'Brien 0–2 Luca Brecel

Table

Group 4
Group 4 was played on 20 March 2021. Judd Trump and Stuart Bingham qualified for the final Group stage.

Matches 

 Stuart Bingham 2–0 Ricky Walden
 Judd Trump 0–2 Dominic Dale
 Oliver Lines 0–2 Ryan Day
 Mark Selby 1–2 Zhou Yuelong
 Stuart Bingham 2–0 Dominic Dale
 Judd Trump 2–1 Ryan Day
 Oliver Lines 2–1 Zhou Yuelong
 Mark Selby 1–2 Ricky Walden
 Stuart Bingham 0–2 Ryan Day
 Judd Trump 2–0 Zhou Yuelong
 Oliver Lines 0–2 Mark Selby
 Dominic Dale 2–1 Ricky Walden
 Stuart Bingham 2–1 Zhou Yuelong
 Judd Trump 2–0 Mark Selby
 Oliver Lines 1–2 Ricky Walden
 Ryan Day 2–0 Dominic Dale
 Stuart Bingham 2–0 Mark Selby
 Judd Trump 2–1 Oliver Lines
 Zhou Yuelong 1–2 Dominic Dale
 Ryan Day 2–1 Ricky Walden
 Stuart Bingham 2–0 Oliver Lines
 Judd Trump 2–1 Ricky Walden
 Mark Selby 2–0 Dominic Dale
 Zhou Yuelong 2–0 Ryan Day
 Stuart Bingham 1–2 Judd Trump
 Oliver Lines 1–2 Dominic Dale
 Mark Selby 2–0 Ryan Day
 Zhou Yuelong 2–1 Ricky Walden

Table

Final group stage
The final group stage also consisted of eight players, and took place on 21 March 2021, with the group winner as the tournament champion. Mark Williams finished top and won the title, with Ali Carter finishing as runner-up and Sam Craigie in third place.

Matches

 Ali Carter 2–0 Stuart Bingham
 Kyren Wilson 2–1 Jack Lisowski
 Sam Craigie 2–0 Xiao Guodong
 Judd Trump 0–2 Mark Williams
 Ali Carter 2–0 Jack Lisowski
 Kyren Wilson 1–2 Xiao Guodong
 Sam Craigie 0–2 Mark Williams
 Judd Trump 2–0 Stuart Bingham
 Ali Carter 1–2 Xiao Guodong
 Kyren Wilson 1–2 Mark Williams
 Sam Craigie 2–0 Judd Trump
 Jack Lisowski 1–2 Stuart Bingham
 Ali Carter 1–2 Mark Williams
 Kyren Wilson 0–2 Judd Trump
 Sam Craigie 2–0 Stuart Bingham
 Xiao Guodong 2–0 Jack Lisowski
 Ali Carter 2–0 Judd Trump
 Kyren Wilson 1–2 Sam Craigie
 Mark Williams 2–0 Jack Lisowski
 Xiao Guodong 0–2 Stuart Bingham
 Ali Carter 2–1 Sam Craigie
 Kyren Wilson 0–2 Stuart Bingham
 Judd Trump 2–0 Jack Lisowski
 Mark Williams 2–1 Xiao Guodong
 Ali Carter 2–0 Kyren Wilson
 Sam Craigie 2–1 Jack Lisowski
 Judd Trump 2–0 Xiao Guodong
 Mark Williams 1–2 Stuart Bingham

Table 

 
Key:P=Matchesplayed; W=Matcheswon; L=Matcheslost; FW=Frameswon; FL=Frameslost; FD=Framedifference

Century breaks
A total of 146 century breaks were made during the tournament.

 147, 106  Gary Wilson
 143, 133, 105, 101, 100  Zhao Xintong
 143, 132, 128, 115, 112, 100  Sam Craigie
 143, 101, 100  Jimmy Robertson
 142, 140, 125, 116  Mark Selby
 142, 135, 109  Joe Perry
 142, 115, 102  Robert Milkins
 141, 135, 130, 129, 115, 103, 101, 100  Ali Carter
 141  Ronnie O'Sullivan
 140  Rod Lawler
 140  Elliot Slessor
 140  Jimmy White
 138  Mitchell Mann
 137, 135, 103  Ben Woollaston
 137, 134, 124, 117  Stuart Bingham
 137, 120  Stuart Carrington
 137, 110  Lyu Haotian
 136, 134, 111  Zhou Yuelong
 136, 115, 112  Anthony McGill
 136, 115  Yuan Sijun
 136  Anthony Hamilton
 135, 132, 129, 126, 113, 104, 101  Kyren Wilson
 135  Joe O'Connor
 134, 133, 117, 113  Fergal O'Brien
 134  Paul Davison
 133, 131, 105  Lu Ning
 133  Ashley Hugill
 132, 117, 108, 100  Alexander Ursenbacher
 132, 105  Barry Hawkins
 129  Ricky Walden
 128, 121, 118, 116, 116, 101, 100  Judd Trump
 127, 126, 123, 104  Xiao Guodong
 127  Florian Nüßle
 126  Tian Pengfei
 125, 107  Jamie Jones
 124, 116  Martin O'Donnell
 122  Nigel Bond
 122  Jackson Page
 121, 116, 107, 106, 104  Shaun Murphy
 121  Chen Zifan
 120, 102  Luca Brecel
 120  Oliver Lines
 119, 100  Igor Figueiredo
 113, 101  Chris Wakelin
 113  Louis Heathcote
 111  Jak Jones
 111  Alan McManus
 111  Noppon Saengkham
 110 Brian Ochoiski
 108, 102, 101  Mark Williams
 107, 105  Michael Holt
 107, 101  Zhao Jianbo
 107  Xu Si
 106, 103, 102  Jack Lisowski
 106 Dylan Emery
 105  Jordan Brown
 105  Jamie Clarke
 104, 102  Allan Taylor
 103  Kacper Filipiak
 102  Mark Davis
 102  David Gilbert
 102  Steven Hallworth
 101, 100  Ryan Day
 101  Andrew Higginson
 101  Li Hang
 100  Simon Lichtenberg
 100  Riley Parsons

Notes

References

External links
 World Snooker Tour – Calendar 2020/2021 

WST Pro Series
Sport in Milton Keynes
WST Pro Series
2021
WST Pro Series
WST Pro Series
Snooker ranking tournaments